Bank Ten Cate & Cie. N.V. is a Dutch bank focused on private banking services and asset management.

History 
The bank was founded in 1881 by the family Ten Cate of the same textile factory in Twente. It has about 60 employees, the management, the private bankers, investment advisors, secretarial support and other support services (back office). It is the only Dutch bank that is still completely family-owned.

Services 
Bank Ten Cate focusses on asset management in a variety of forms.  The type of administration depends on the needs of individual clients.

References 
Article contains translated text from Bank Ten Cate & Cie on the Dutch Wikipedia retrieved on 12 March 2017.

External links 
Homepage

Banks based in Amsterdam
Banks established in 1881
Dutch companies established in 1881